Mall Vaasma (22 February 1945 – 4 December 2009) was one of Estonia's top mycologists. She graduated from the University of Tartu in 1974 with a degree in botany. After her graduation, she worked as a senior lab assistant for Department of Mycology at the Estonian Institute of Zoology and Botany from 1973  and at the Natural History Museum of the University of Tartu from 2008 until her death in 2009 after being struck by a car while crossing the road in Tartu.

She also co-authored a number of works on mushrooms.

References

External links
Photo at Looduskalender (Estonian)
News of her death on eElurikkus (Estonian) 
News of her death on Postimees, December 7, 2009 (Estonian)

Estonian mycologists
1945 births
2009 deaths
University of Tartu alumni
Road incident deaths in Estonia
Pedestrian road incident deaths
Women mycologists
Estonian women scientists